Bernardino Fabbian (born February 11, 1950 in Resana) is a retired Italian professional football player.

Honours
 Serie A champion: 1970/71.

1950 births
Living people
Italian footballers
Serie A players
Serie B players
Inter Milan players
A.C. Reggiana 1919 players
Calcio Foggia 1920 players
Novara F.C. players

Association football midfielders